Elena Hila (born 20 May 1974) is a female shot putter from Romania. Her personal best throw is 18.73 metres, achieved in May 2002 in Snagov.

Achievements

External links

1974 births
Living people
Romanian female shot putters